Devil Hunter (also known as The Man Hunter, Mandingo Manhunter, Jungfrau unter Kannibalen and Sexo Caníbal) is a 1980 splatter film directed by Jesús Franco under the pseudonym "Clifford Brown" and written by Franco and Julián Esteban (under the pseudonym Julius Valery). It was shot back-to-back with Franco's Mondo Cannibale (also 1980). It is one of the infamous "video nasties" that were banned in the United Kingdom in the 1980s.

Lina Romay was credited with co-directing this film, while Franco's first wife Nicole Guettard edited it. This shows that Franco was still with Guettard as late as 1980 (eventually they broke up and she was replaced in Franco's life by Romay). Pierre Chevalier was the art director on this film.

Release 
The film was released on 5 December 1980 in West Germany as Jungfrau unter Kannibalen, and in Spain as Sexo Canibal. It was theatrically released in the U.S., the U.K. and Italy as The Man Hunter, but was later released to video in the U.K. as Devil Hunter. It also appeared on U.S. video as Mandingo Manhunter.
It was banned as a video nasty in the United Kingdom in the early 1980s.

Critical reception 
Devil Hunter has been critically panned. Kurt Dahlke of DVD Talk called it a "horrible, trying piece of dreck that should have remained legendary and lost. That said, it's pretty fun stuff." DVD Verdict, similarly, called the film "trash" and writing that "the storyline is threadbare and the characters are idiots (the horrid dubbing makes their dialogue endlessly entertaining) but Jess Franco does not hesitate in blasting out the nipples and bloodshed."

Cast

References

External links 
 

1980 films
1980 horror films
West German films
Spanish supernatural horror films
German supernatural horror films
French supernatural horror films
Sexploitation films
1980s Spanish-language films
Cannibal-boom films
German splatter films
Italian splatter films
Spanish splatter films
Films set on islands
Films directed by Jesús Franco
1980s Italian films
1980s French films
1980s German films